Events in the year 1911 in Spain.

Incumbents
Monarch: Alfonso XIII
President of the Government: José Canalejas

Births

September 15 - José Muguerza. (died 1980)

Deaths

April 9 - Manuel Aguirre de Tejada. (born 1827)
 June 7 - Carlos Fernández Shaw. (born 1865)
July 4 - José Espasa Anguera. (born 1840)

References

 
Years of the 20th century in Spain
1910s in Spain
Spain
Spain